Mangual is a surname. Notable people with the surname include:

Ángel Mangual (born 1947), Puerto Rican baseball player
Iván Mangual
Pepe Mangual (born 1952), Puerto Rican baseball player
Tomás de Jesús Mangual (1944–2011), Puerto Rican journalist

Spanish-language surnames